Phrypeus is a genus of ground beetles in the family Carabidae. This genus has a single species, Phrypeus rickseckeri. It is found in the United States and Canada.

References

Trechinae
Monotypic Carabidae genera